The Costa Blanca Challenge was a golf tournament on the Challenge Tour that was played in Spain.

The event was only played in 2000. Johan Ryström carded a course record 65 on the second round. England's James Hepworth carded a final-round 67 to end up 11-under 277, a stroke behind the all-Swedish playoff in which Ryström defeated Henrik Stenson at the first extra hole.

Winners

References

External links
Coverage on the Challenge Tour's official site

Former Challenge Tour events
Golf tournaments in Spain